Riebener See is a lake in Brandenburg, Germany. At an elevation of 34 m, its surface area is 38 ha. It is located in Rieben, an Ortsteil of the town of Beelitz.

Lakes of Brandenburg
Potsdam-Mittelmark
LRiebenerSee